The chestnut-backed laughingthrush (Pterorhinus nuchalis) is a species of bird in the family Leiothrichidae. It is found in Northeast India and northern Myanmar.This species inhabits secondary growth, thickets, tall grasslands with scattered shrubs or dense bushes in stony scrub-covered ravines and hills, from the lowlands up to c.900 m. It is threatened by habitat loss.

The chestnut-backed laughingthrush was at one time placed in the genus Garrulax but following the publication of a comprehensive molecular phylogenetic study in 2018, it was moved to the resurrected genus Pterorhinus.

References

chestnut-backed laughingthrush
Birds of Myanmar
Birds of Northeast India
chestnut-backed laughingthrush
Taxonomy articles created by Polbot
Taxobox binomials not recognized by IUCN